Garnet Charles "Chuck" Porter (born December 29, 1964) is a Canadian politician. He represented the electoral district of Hants West in the Nova Scotia House of Assembly as a Liberal from 2006 until his retirement from politics in 2021.

Before politics
Porter was a paramedic for 17 years and also served as a Councillor in the town of Windsor, Nova Scotia.

Political career
Elected in 2006, Porter was a member of the Progressive Conservatives until June 13, 2014, when he left the party to sit as an independent citing leadership as a factor in his decision. On February 17, 2016, Porter joined the Liberal caucus. Porter was re-elected in the 2017 election.

On July 5, 2018, Porter was appointed to the Executive Council of Nova Scotia as Minister of Municipal Affairs.

Electoral record

|-

|Progressive Conservative
|Chuck Porter
|align="right"|4,468 
|align="right"|50.75
|align="right"|
|-

|Liberal
|Claude Sherman O'Hara
|align="right"|3,279 
|align="right"|37.24 
|align="right"|
|-

|New Democratic Party
| Brian Stephens
|align="right"|888 
|align="right"|10.28
|align="right"|
|}

|-

|Progressive Conservative
|Chuck Porter
|align="right"|3,364
|align="right"|37.24
|align="right"|
|-

|Liberal
|Paula Lunn
|align="right"|3,065
|align="right"|33.93
|align="right"|
|-

|New Democratic Party
|Barbara Gallagher
|align="right"|2,401
|align="right"|26.58
|align="right"|
|-

|}

|-

|Progressive Conservative
|Chuck Porter
|align="right"|2969
|align="right"|34.6
|align="right"|
|-

|Liberal
|Paula Lunn
|align="right"|2924
|align="right"|34.08
|align="right"|
|-

|New Democratic Party
|Sean Bennett
|align="right"|2486
|align="right"|28.97
|align="right"|
|-

|}

References

External links
 Members of the Nova Scotia Legislative Assembly

1964 births
Nova Scotia Independent MLAs
Progressive Conservative Association of Nova Scotia MLAs
Living people
Members of the Executive Council of Nova Scotia
Nova Scotia municipal councillors
21st-century Canadian politicians
Paramedics
Nova Scotia Liberal Party MLAs